Secret Number (stylized as SECRET NUMBER) is a South Korean girl group formed by Vine Entertainment. The group debuted on May 19, 2020, with the single album Who Dis? with the five-member line up of Léa, Dita, Jinny, Soodam, and Denise. The sixth and seventh members, Zuu and Minji, joined the group in October 2021. Denise departed from the group on February 5, 2022.

Name

According to the group, their name means that, "Everyone has a secret number [for a password or PIN code], which is usually a birthday, anniversary, or some other special number. We want to hold such special meaning in public. Our logo is designed like a password box with five stars, representing the five of us."

History

2011–2020: Pre-debut activities
Léa was previously a member of South Korean girl group Skarf between 2011 and 2014 under the stage name Hana. She later participated in Mix Nine under her birth name Mizuki Ogawa in 2017 where she finished in 109th place.

Jinny was previously a trainee under YG Entertainment between 2013 and 2017. She later participated in Produce 48 where she finished in 69th place.

Minji previously participated in the survival program Produce 101 but was eliminated in episode 5, and like Jinny, Minji also participated in Produce 48 and finished in 53rd place

Soodam was once a member of a traditional dance group Little Angels Children's Folk Ballet of Korea

Denise was previously participated in a Korean reality television show competition titled K-pop Star 5 and became a member of the Mazinga S unit, then in May 2016 Denise became a YG Entertainment trainee for 2 years and chose to leave

On March 12, 2020, Vine Entertainment announced that the group was initially scheduled for debut on March 26, 2020, however there was a push back due to COVID-19 pandemic.

2020–2021: Introduction, debut with Who Dis?, Got That Boom, Fire Saturday and new members

On April 29, 2020, the members were revealed in a dance cover video published on YouTube along with the group name Secret Number. On May 6, 2020, Vine Entertainment announced that Secret Number would release their debut single album Who Dis? on May 19. The members were officially introduced individually from May 11 to 14 (in order: Jinny, Léa, Soodam, Dita, and Denise). The debut single album consisting of two tracks, lead single "Who Dis?" and "Holiday", was released on May 19. The group made their broadcast debut on KBS2's Music Bank on May 22 where they performed their lead single "Who Dis?". On May 23, it was announced that the music video "Who Dis?" has more than 5 million views.

On October 22, 2020, Vine Entertainment announced that Secret Number would release their second single album Got That Boom on November 4. The single album, consisting of two tracks, lead single "Got That Boom" and "Privacy", was released on November 4.

Secret Number's commercial success in their first five months earned them several rookie awards at major Korean year-end music award shows, including the Asia Artist Awards, APAN Music Awards, Asian Pop Music Awards, and Ten Asia Global Top Ten Awards. Additionally, Billboard Korea named them as one of the Rookie K-pop Groups of 2020.

On September 30, 2021, Vine Entertainment announced through their Instagram account, that Denise would not be participating in the group's upcoming third album promotions due to contract negotiation matters.

On October 8, 2021, Vine Entertainment announced that Secret Number would release their third single album Fire Saturday on October 27. On October 16, Zuu was introduced as a new member of Secret Number. A day later, Minji was introduced as the second new member.

2022–present: Denise's departure, Doomchita, Japan promotion and Tap
On February 5, 2022, Denise announced her departure from the group and Vine Entertainment on her Instagram account.

On May 12, 2022, Vine Entertainment announced that Secret Number would release their fourth single album Doomchita on June 8.

On August 5, 2022, Secret Number entered into an exclusive cooperation contract agreement with the company SP & Co., Ltd. for promotion and distribution in Japan

On November 9, 2022, Vine Entertainment announced that Secret Number would release their fifth single album Tap on November 16.

On March 3, 2023, Secret Number released their Japanese debut single "Like It Like It" digitally. It was also announced that the extended play of the same name containing six tracks including the Japanese debut single would be released on April 5.

Endorsement
On October 5, 2020, Dita was announced as the brand ambassador for global cosmetic brand Nacific Indonesia.

Members
Position adapted from Cosmopolitan Indonesia.

 Léa –  vocalist
 Dita – vocalist, dancer
 Jinny –  rapper
 Minji – vocalist
 Soodam – vocalist
 Zuu – vocalist,

Former members
 Denise – vocalist

Timeline

Discography

Extended plays

Single albums

Singles

Soundtrack appearances

Other charted songs

Videography

Music videos

Filmography

Web series

Concert and tours

Online concert 

 Super Mini Concert (2020)

Concert participations
 Asia Song Festival Gyeongju (2020)
 KCON Saudi Arabia (2022)

Award and nominations

Listicles

Notes

References

External links
 

K-pop music groups
2020 establishments in South Korea
South Korean girl groups
South Korean dance music groups
Musical groups established in 2020
Musical groups from Seoul
English-language singers from South Korea
Japanese-language singers of South Korea
Mandarin-language singers of South Korea
South Korean electronic musicians
South Korean synthpop groups
South Korean women in electronic music